Newbridge railway station may refer to:

Newbridge railway station (Ireland)
Newbridge railway station (Wales)
Newbridge railway station, New South Wales